Combretum molle, the velvet bushwillow, is a medium to large tree species in the genus Combretum found in western, eastern and southern Africa.

The larvae of Parosmodes morantii and Acalyptris molleivora feed on C. molle. It is recorded to contain antioxidants such as punicalagin, which is also found in the other Myrtale pomegranates (Punica granatum), a somewhat related plant. It also contains the 1alpha-hydroxycycloartenoid saponins mollic acid glucoside and mollic acid 3β-D-xyloside.

Extracts from the bark of C. molle show antibacterial and antifungal as well as in vitro antiprotozoal activities. Mollic acid glucoside shows cardiovascular effects.

See also 
 List of Southern African indigenous trees and woody lianes

References

External links 

molle
Trees of Africa
Flora of East Tropical Africa
Flora of Northeast Tropical Africa
Flora of South Tropical Africa
Flora of Southern Africa
Flora of West Tropical Africa
Flora of West-Central Tropical Africa
Plants described in 1827
Taxa named by Robert Brown (botanist, born 1773)